The Catholic Church in Nordic Europe has 5 dioceses and two territorial prelatures. All of these territories are immediately subject to the Holy See, with no intermediating archdiocese.

List of dioceses
Diocese of Copenhagen
Diocese of Helsinki
Diocese of Oslo
Diocese of Reykjavik
Diocese of Stockholm
Territorial Prelature of Trondheim
Territorial Prelature of Tromsø

External links 
http://www.catholic-hierarchy.org/diocese/qview7.html#by

Nordic Europe